Zoviyeh-ye Pain may refer to:
 Zoviyeh-ye Do
 Zoviyeh-ye Yek-e Sofla